Ginwiłł - is a Polish coat of arms. It was used by several szlachta families in the times of the Polish–Lithuanian Commonwealth.

History

Blazon

Notable bearers

Notable bearers of this coat of arms include:
 Bartłomiej Ginwiłł (also  or ) Starost of Upytė

See also

 Polish heraldry
 Heraldry
 Coat of arms
 List of Polish nobility coats of arms

External links 
 Herbarz Polski - Od Średniowiecza do XX wieku (Tadeusz Gajl) in English and Polish.
 Genealogia Dynastyczna/Dynastic Genealogy (Ryszard Jurzak) in English and Polish.
 Słownik genealogiczny - leksykon (Marcin Niewalda - redaktor naczelny) in Polish.
 Ornatowski.com (Artur Ornatowski) in Polish
- Herby szlacheckie Rzeczypospolitej Obojga Narodów (Tadeusz Gajl)
- Herbarz rodowy (Alfred Znamierowski)
- Szlachta wylegitymowana w Królestwie Polskim w latach 1836-1861(1867), (Elżbieta Sęczys)
- Ornatowski.com – Rodziny (Artur Ornatowski)
 Wykaz Rodów Szlacheckich (Andrzej Brzezina Winiarski) in Polish.
 Chrząński: Tablice odmian herbowich, tablica XXII - Mały herbarz Adama Kromera i przyjaciół (Adam Kromer) in Polish.

Polish coats of arms